Victor Ivanovich Ishayev (born 16 April 1948) is a Russian politician. He had been the Presidential plenipotentiary envoy in the Far Eastern Federal District of Russia from 2009 to 2012, the governor of Khabarovsk Krai from 1991 to 2009, and a Deputy of the Federation Council of the Federal Assembly of the Russian Federation from 1993 to 2001.

On 21 May 2012, he was appointed as Minister for Russian Far East in the Dmitry Medvedev's Cabinet.

On 28 March 2019, he was arrested in Moscow on charges of abuse of power and embezzlement.

Property and income 
According to official data, Ishayev's income was 6.37 million rubles in 2011, his wife's income was 3.37 million rubles. Together with his wife, Ishayev owns a land plot of 22 acres, a house, two apartments, two Mercedes-Benz cars and a Glastron boat.

Honours and awards
 Order of Merit for the Fatherland;
2nd class (16 April 2008) – for services to the state, a large contribution to the socio-economic development of the region and many years of fruitful work
3rd class (5 August 2003) – for outstanding contribution to strengthening Russian statehood, and many years of honest work
4th class (2 March 1999) – for hard work and consistent application of the course of economic reforms
 Order of Honour (1996)
 Order of Labour Glory, 3rd class
 Order of the Holy Prince Daniel of Moscow, 1st and 2nd classes
 Gratitude of the President of the Russian Federation (19 February 2001) – for outstanding contribution to strengthening Russian statehood
 Gratitude of the President of the Russian Federation (25 August 2005) – for active participation in the work of the State Council FederatsiiRasporyazhenie President of the Russian Federation of 25 August 2005 No. 368-rp "On the Promotion of the State Council of the Russian Federation"
 Diploma of the Government of the Russian Federation (27 May 1998) – for his great personal contribution to the socio-economic development of the Khabarovsk Territory and long conscientious work
 Diploma of the Government of the Russian Federation (16 April 2008) – for his great personal contribution to the socio-economic development of the Khabarovsk Territory and long conscientious work
 Medal "For Merits in National Security" (Security Council of Russia, 2010)

References

1948 births
Living people
1st class Active State Councillors of the Russian Federation
Communist Party of the Soviet Union members
Full Members of the Russian Academy of Sciences
Governors of Khabarovsk Krai
Medvedev Administration personnel
Members of the Federation Council of Russia (1994–1996)
Members of the Federation Council of Russia (1996–2000)
People from Yaysky District
Recipients of the Order "For Merit to the Fatherland", 2nd class
Recipients of the Order "For Merit to the Fatherland", 3rd class
Recipients of the Order "For Merit to the Fatherland", 4th class
Recipients of the Order of Honour (Russia)
Recipients of the Order of Labour Glory
Russian economists
United Russia politicians